Virginia Ruano Pascual and Paola Suárez defeated Kim Clijsters and Ai Sugiyama in the final, 6–4, 3–6, 6–3 to win the doubles tennis title at the 2003 WTA Tour Championships.

Elena Dementieva and Janette Husárová were the reigning champions, but did not qualify this year.

Seeds

Draw

Finals

Doubles
2003 WTA Tour